Felix Kiernan (18 April 1929 – 2004) was a Scottish footballer who played for Albion Rovers, Dumbarton and Stenhousemuir.

Kiernan died in Coatbridge in 2004, at the age of 75.

References

1929 births
2004 deaths
Scottish footballers
Dumbarton F.C. players
Albion Rovers F.C. players
Stenhousemuir F.C. players
Scottish Football League players
Association football inside forwards